CYA or CyA can refer to:

Ciclosporin
Czapek yeast agar
Cover your ass